is a Japanese politician serving in the House of Representatives in the Diet (national legislature) as a member of the New Komeito Party. A native of Wakayama Prefecture and graduate of Soka University he was elected for the first time in 2005.

References 
 

Living people
1962 births
New Komeito politicians
Members of the House of Representatives (Japan)
21st-century Japanese politicians